Yorktown is an unincorporated community in Lincoln County, Arkansas, United States. Yorktown has a post office with ZIP code 71678.

References

Unincorporated communities in Lincoln County, Arkansas
Unincorporated communities in Arkansas